Wayne Taylor Racing is a sports car racing team that competes in the IMSA SportsCar Championship Daytona Prototype International class. The team campaigns the No. 10 Konica Minolta sponsored Acura ARX-06 full-time for Filipe Albuquerque and Ricky Taylor.

History 
The team was founded in 2004 as the Riley Technologies factory team, with title sponsorship from bank holding company SunTrust. The lineup of Wayne Taylor and Max Angelelli finished second in the Daytona Prototype teams championship in 2004 and won the Daytona Prototype team and driver championships in 2005.

For the 2007 season, Riley and Wayne Taylor split ways and Wayne Taylor Racing began to run the #10 SunTrust Racing entry. Wayne Taylor retired as a driver for the 2008 season and signed Michael Valiante as second driver; also the team switched to a Dallara chassis. In 2009, Ford engines were adopted and Brian Frisselle became the second driver.

For the 2010 season, Angelelli was joined by Ricky Taylor, son of Wayne Taylor. They collected a win and seven podiums, finishing runners-up. In 2011, SunTrust Racing switched to Chevrolet engines; they won three races and got eight podiums, resulting runners-up. After adopting the Corvette DP3 chassis, the duo got three wins in 2012 and resulted 6th in the drivers standings.

In 2013, Wayne Taylor Racing lost the SunTrust sponsorship. Ricky Taylor left the team, and was replaced by Jordan Taylor, also son of Wayne Taylor.  Angelelli and Jordan Taylor would go on to win the final Daytona Prototype championship before the merger of Grand-Am and the American Le Mans Series in 2014, winning five races, including the final three.

For 2014, the first year of the United SportsCar Championship, Angelelli will enter into a semi-retirement, racing with the team for the endurance events. Ricky Taylor rejoins the team to drive full-time alongside brother Jordan.

Racing results

Notable race victories 

24 Hours of Daytona – 2005, 2017, 2019, and 2020
12 Hours of Sebring – 2017
Petit Le Mans - 2014, 2018, 2020

WeatherTech SportsCar Championship wins

References

External links 
 Official website

Grand American Road Racing Association teams
American auto racing teams
Indy Lights teams
Auto racing teams established in 2004
WeatherTech SportsCar Championship teams